Kingly Street is a street in London's Soho district. It runs north to south from Liberty's and Foubert's Place to Beak Street, in parallel to, and between, Regent Street and Carnaby Street.

It was known as King Street until 1906.

The Bag O'Nails at no 9, was a live music club and meeting place for musicians in the 1960s, where Paul McCartney met his future wife Linda Eastman in May 1967.

The Northern end runs under the three storey archway that is part of the building that houses the Liberty department store. The renowned Liberty Clock forms part of the masonry section of the archway and looks out over the Northern entrance of Kingly Street.

References

Soho, London
Streets in Soho